Chatuga River is a variant spelling for three rivers in the United States:

Chattooga River, forming the boundary between Georgia and South Carolina
Chattooga River (Alabama-Georgia), in Chattooga County, Georgia, flowing into Alabama
Chauga River in South Carolina